Đorđe Vlajić, also written as Djordje Vlajić (born 8 September 1977 in Belgrade), is a Serbian footballer manager and former midfielder.

His career is linked to FK Beograd, the club where he started and finished his playing career, and where, after hanging his boots, he started coaching the youth squads at the club.

During his playing career, he played with FK Zvezdara, OFK Beograd and FK Hajduk Beograd in the First League of FR Yugoslavia, then abroad with Hungarian side Győri ETO and Romanian CFR Cluj, before returning to Serbia where he played with FK Obilić, FK Inđija and FK Hajduk Beograd in the Serbian First League.  He finished his career playing with FK Beograd in the Serbian League Belgrade, Serbian third tier.

References

1977 births
Living people
Footballers from Belgrade
Serbian footballers
Serbian expatriate footballers
Expatriate footballers in Hungary
Expatriate footballers in Romania
Liga I players
Nemzeti Bajnokság I players
FK Zvezdara players
OFK Beograd players
FK Obilić players
FK Hajduk Beograd players
FK Inđija players
Győri ETO FC players
CFR Cluj players
Association football midfielders